KTKR (760 AM) is a sports radio station serving the San Antonio, Texas, United States area. KTKR, more popularly known as "Ticket 760", is owned by iHeartMedia (previously Clear Channel Communications until September 2014) as a sister station to, among others, heritage station WOAI. Its studios are located in the Stone Oak neighborhood in Far North San Antonio, and the transmitter site is just east of the city along I-10.

The station lineup includes Mike Taylor, Andy Everett, Sam 'Biggest Puma' Freas, Dan Patrick, Colin Cowherd, and other Fox Sports Radio programs. It is also the flagship station of UTSA football and basketball. The station is also the local affiliate of Westwood One's NFL broadcasts, as well as the Texas Longhorns basketball.

History of AM 760
KSJL received its callsign on July 19, 1982. It signed on two years later under the ownership of Inner City Broadcasting as All Hit 76 KSJL, a Top 40 format broadcasting in AM stereo.

It would later become part of Super Q 96/76 when Inner City Broadcasting acquired KSLR-FM from C&W Wireless in 1986; the combo carried a Contemporary Hit Radio format. In late of 1988, KSJL would become part of the Satellite Music Network (now Citadel) Z Rock format, dropping the simulcast of 96.1 FM. This would last until 1992 when Satellite Music Network would not renew their Z-Rock franchise on the AM band, so Inner City decided to take the Urban route, using The Touch format which consisted of Urban Adult Contemporary music. In 1993, Inner City Broadcasting would sell KSJL to Clear Channel Communications for $725,000, and as a result KSJL's format was moved to 96.1, replacing "96rock" KSAQ.

KSJL became news/talk/sports KZXS (branded as WOAI-760) airing Larry King's radio show.

KZXS would later become KTKR Talk Radio 760, dropping its sports programming. One year later, KTKR flipped to sports as The Ticket 760.

References

External links
KTKR official website

TKR
Radio stations established in 1982
IHeartMedia radio stations
1982 establishments in Texas